Josef "Jupp" Rasselnberg (18 December 1912 – 9 February 2005) was a German former football player and trainer who featured in the German national team as a striker. The summit of his international career was the 1934 FIFA World Cup qualifier against Luxembourg on 11 March 1934, in which he scored four times. In his other eight international matches he scored an additional four goals.

Honours
Benrath
Westdeutscher Pokal (West German Cup) (2): 1932, 1933
Gauliga Niederrhein I (2): 1934, 1935

References

External links
 
 
 

1912 births
2005 deaths
Footballers from Düsseldorf
Association football forwards
German footballers
Germany international footballers
Arminia Bielefeld managers
German football managers